Sabrina Julienne Francine Delannoy (born 18 May 1986) is a retired French football player who played for French Division 1 Féminine club Paris Saint-Germain. She primarily played as a centre back, but was also capable to play as a right back. Delannoy is a former women's youth international having played at under-20 and under-21 level. With the under-20 team, she played at the 2006 FIFA U-20 Women's World Championship.

Club statistics
As of 1 September 2016

International goals

Honours

Club
Paris Saint-Germain
Coupe de France Féminine: Winner 2010

References

External links
 PSG player profile
 
 
 Player stats  at footofeminin.fr

1986 births
Living people
French women's footballers
France women's youth international footballers
France women's international footballers
CNFE Clairefontaine players
Paris Saint-Germain Féminine players
People from Béthune
Women's association football defenders
2015 FIFA Women's World Cup players
Footballers at the 2016 Summer Olympics
Olympic footballers of France
Division 1 Féminine players
Sportspeople from Pas-de-Calais
Footballers from Hauts-de-France